Cosmochilus is genus of cyprinid fish found in East and Southeast Asia. There are currently four species in this genus.

Species
 Cosmochilus cardinalis X. L. Chu & T. R. Roberts, 1985
 Cosmochilus falcifer Regan, 1906
 Cosmochilus harmandi Sauvage, 1878
 Cosmochilus nanlaensis Y. F. Chen, Z. C. He & S. P. He, 1992

References

 

Cyprinidae genera
Cyprinid fish of Asia